Shakin' is the second studio album of American country music band Sawyer Brown, released in 1985 on Capitol Records. It features the singles "Shakin'", "Heart Don't Fall Now", and "Betty's Bein' Bad", all of which charted on the Hot Country Singles charts.

Track listing

Personnel 
 Mark Miller – lead vocals
 Gregg "Hobie" Hubbard – keyboards, backing vocals
 Bobby Randall – acoustic guitar, electric guitars, backing vocals
 Jim Scholten – bass
 Joe "Curley" Smyth – drums, percussion

Production 
 Randy Scruggs – producer 
 Mike Bradley – engineer 
 Tom Semmes – engineer 
 Gene Eichelberger – remixing 
 Milan Bogdan – editing 
 Glenn Meadows – mastering at Masterfonics (Nashville, Tennessee)
 Roy Kohara – art direction 
 John O'Brien – design 
 Greg Gorman – photography

Charts

Weekly charts

Year-end charts

References

External links
[ Shakin'] at Allmusic

1986 albums
Capitol Records albums
Sawyer Brown albums